Riverside Health System is an integrated, not-for-profit health network serving two million people annually. It has been operating in Eastern Virginia since 1915, and offers a variety of services and programs in the areas of prevention, primary care, diagnostics, neurosciences, oncology, orthopedics, aging-related services, rehabilitation, medical education, home care and hospice.

Riverside headquarters are located in Newport News, Virginia.

Operations
Riverside operates four acute care hospitals and a behavioral health hospital, in addition to a physical rehabilitation hospital and Critical Illness Recovery Hospital in partnership with Select Medical. Riverside Medical Group has more than 700 physicians and advanced practice providers across a broad spectrum of specialties. Riverside Lifelong Health operates six nursing home facilities and three continuing care retirement communities, and home health and hospice services. In addition, Riverside operates the College of Health Careers and four medical residency programs. The company employs more than 9,500 team members throughout Eastern Virginia.

List of Riverside Hospitals 

Riverside operates four acute care hospitals and three specialty hospitals:
 Riverside Regional Medical Center (Newport News, VA)
 Riverside Walter Reed Hospital, (Gloucester, VA)
 Riverside Shore Memorial Hospital (Onancock, VA)
 Riverside Doctors' Hospital Williamsburg (Williamsburg, VA)
 Riverside Rehabilitation Hospital (Yorktown, VA)
 Riverside Behavioral Health Center (Hampton, VA)
 Select Specialty Hospital - Hampton Roads (Newport News, VA)

Riverside Medical Group 

Riverside Medical Group, comprising more than 700 providers, is among the largest multispecialty group practices in the state of Virginia. Care is provided in 132 locations across Eastern Virginia. Riverside Medical Group was among the inaugural provider groups to use electronic medical records and follows a multidisciplinary approach to care.

Educational Facilities 

Riverside College of Health Careers offers accredited programs in Nurse Aide, Practical Nursing, Professional Nursing and the RN-to-Bachelor of Science in Nursing programs. All graduates are eligible to sit for their respective licensing exams.

Riverside Foundation 

The Riverside Foundation stewards investments in health and happiness, supporting programs in cancer care, education, lifelong health and beyond. The foundation partners with communities to promote wellness.

References

External links
 Riverside Health System

Hospital networks in the United States
Companies based in Newport News, Virginia
Medical and health organizations based in Virginia
Health care companies based in Virginia
Healthcare in Virginia